John Dewey High School is a public school in Gravesend, Brooklyn, New York City. It was founded and based on the educational principles of John Dewey. The school, under the supervision of the New York City Department of Education, was named a New American High School in 2000.

The school opened on September 8, 1969, with 1,130 freshmen and sophomores. It grew in the next two academic years to include juniors and seniors. There currently are over 3,200 students. It counts among its alumni producer and director Larry Charles, filmmaker Spike Lee, Pulitzer Prize winner Donald Margulies, radio personality David Brody, photographer Gregory Crewdson, WWE wrestler Jayson Paul (aka JTG), scientist Robert Sapolsky, astrologer-journalist Eric Francis, news correspondent Ray Suarez, and film actress Michelle Ye.

John Dewey High School was also the first "educational-option" school in New York City, in which applicants are admitted through academic groups based on their citywide test scores: high, middle, and low-achieving. Dewey selects students from each of the three groups. Other schools in the city, such as Edward R. Murrow High School, Murry Bergtraum High School and Norman Thomas High School have since opened, following Dewey's "ed-op" system of admissions.

Academics

Each academic year is currently split into four cycles. In order to graduate, students must pass a certain number of classes in each department. For example, each student must take 16 cycles of English: 8 literature classes, 4 writing classes, 2 communication classes, and 2 electives. For Social Studies, each student must take 16 cycles of classes. Students need 8 global history courses, 4 American history, 2 economic classes, and 2 government classes. Mathematics requires 12 cycles, and each student must complete Math A. The Science Department requires students to take 12 cycles of classes. The foreign language options are Spanish and Chinese. When a student chooses a preferred language, the course must be taken for either for 4 or 12 cycles.

Art and music are important in the Dewey curriculum, a student can take photography, music, or film classes. Each student must take 2 cycles of each. As in all high school in New York City, Dewey offers health education and physical education. Each student must take 14 cycles of physical education and 2 cycles of health, totaling 16 cycles. There are also many electives and extra curricular activities, such as dance, business education, technology, home economics, and health careers and occupations. There is also a COOP program for senior students. Dewey has been credited for being a college-like high school because classes are not restricted by the students' year, and for its campus.

Advanced Placement Courses
John Dewey High School offers approximately 17 Advanced Placement courses, one of the highest for New York City public high schools. These include courses in

 AP Biology
 AP Calculus AB
 AP Calculus BC
 AP Chemistry
 AP Chinese Language and Culture
 AP Computer Science A
 AP English Language
 AP English Literature
 AP US Government and Politics
 AP Art History
 AP Physics B
 AP Microeconomics
 AP Macroeconomics
 AP Psychology
 AP Spanish
 AP Statistics
 AP United States History
 AP World History

Academy of Finance
John Dewey High School houses the first Academy of Finance, which was started by Sandy Weill in 1982. The Academy of Finance prepares students for post-secondary education and careers through a theme-based, contextualized curriculum approach.

The Academy of Finance introduces high school students to the broad career opportunities of the financial services industry. One of three member programs of the National Academy Foundation, it operates as a small learning community and is now located in more than 275 high schools nationwide.

Each student is allowed to apply for the Academy of Finance. During the sophomore year, a student who is interested in joining submits an application and waits for an interview with Academy coordinator. The Academy of Finance is only available to juniors and seniors who have applied during their sophomore year.

Council For Unity

John Dewey High School is home to the first Council For Unity, a national non-profit organization founded in 1975 Robert DeSena, who was a Dewey teacher at that time. Its mission is to establish racial harmony, respect, peace, and an end to violence in schools and the surrounding community.

The Council for Unity network currently is at more than sixty schools and community centers in New York City, Long Island, Texas, and California. There is a college chapter at the University of Vermont, and an international chapter in Balti, Moldova.

National Honor Society 
Formerly known as ARISTA, the scholastic honor society is served through its National Honor Society chapter. Applicants must have achieved an overall scholastic average of 90 or above. The student must also have a record of service performed each cycle (term) in a school facility. In the early decades of its operation, Dewey had no letter or number grades, and there was no school-wide academic honor society.

School facilities
One of the many innovative features are the Dewey learning centers, which are commonly called "resource centers." These are located centrally between five or six classrooms, staffed by a teacher and a paraprofessional. Each major department has one — English & Literature, Mathematics, Social Studies, Science, Foreign Language, Music, Art and the Universal Resource Center. For each band (class period), subject teachers in designated resource centers are there to facilitate students in academics. Students who are free may go to resource centers for assistance in homework, projects, or independent study, or to socialize with others.

Unlike the majority of New York City public schools, Dewey does not share its campus with any other school. The campus includes the main building, a statue as well as stone plaques to honor alumni. The school has a football, soccer, lacrosse, and softball field which is utilized in various ways. The school also has an outdoor tennis field and two parking lots.

The library has a collections of more than 30,000 books, magazines, and about 12 computers for student, parent, and faculty use.

Students utilize the many facilities in which they work side by side with either their teachers, peers, and friends. This enables students to fulfill their personal interests and can concurrently build a steady foundation for advancements in their life.

Most classroom are outfitted with 2 to 40 computers or laptops. Classroom are also equipped with Smart Boards, Promethean Boards and Elmo Projectors.

Extracurricular activities
The Student Organization facilitates clubs in organizing and fundraising. John Dewey High School offers clubs such as: Anime, Asian, Art-Ink, Christian Culture, Ceramics, Classic Rock, Chess, Dance, Diversity, Fashion Design, Finance, Gardening Club, The Video Game Club, Cinema Club, Key Club, Hebrew Culture, Award Winning Robotics Team, Math, Marine Science, Muslim Culture, Modeling, Model Congress, Sci-Fi, Gay-Straight Alliance, Soccer, and Softball. New clubs are created every year.

There are annual events throughout the campus and the school, such as the Octoberfest, Club Fair, Multicultural Show, Fashion Show, Clash of the Genres (in which different music genres compete), Country Fair (with games, inflatable balloons, caricatures, music, food, sports, and other activities are held all over the school), Field Day, Spirit Week, Blood Drive (students 16 or older have the option to donate blood to those in need) and the "Dewey or Don't We?" talent show.

As of the 2016–2017 school year, John Dewey High School students participate in SING!, an annual student-run musical production which is exclusive to New York City public high schools.

Team #333
Dewey's nationally ranked and award-winning robotics team, Team #333, also known as The Megalodons, has participated in various national and regional competitions. The team avidly participates in "FIRST Robotics," an international competition that attracts schools with robotics teams. The team has also been featured in various local newspapers, including the New York Daily News.

Their efforts have resulted in beating some of the top high schools in the country and some of the specialized high schools in New York City, such as Brooklyn Tech and Stuyvesant High School. Their accomplishments have led to visits from the previous New York City school chancellor Dennis Walcott and astronaut Gregory Olsen. The team has also participated in the opening pitch for the Brooklyn Cyclones.

The team originated as a small after-school club and gradually grew into a highly-selective program with its own classes and curriculum, and currently consists of over fifty members who work during and after school in an industrial arts shop located in the school.

Sports
For more than 30 years, Dewey did not have varsity sports teams. The lack of inter-school sports competition grew out of its educational design, meant to de-emphasize competition, winning and losing, and to encourage achievement for its own sake. However, the school has intramural athletic programs, in which students can play various sports for recreation.

However, starting in the 2011–2012 school year, the school changed its stance on competition and competitive sports with other public high schools began, following a majority vote for it. It started with boys' and girls' soccer teams and girls' basketball, cross country, and cheerleading. The team name for all sports is The Dewey Dragons. Teams have expanded to include lacrosse, boys' and girls' softball, boys' and girls' tennis, and girls' volleyball.

Student demographics

Awards
In 1999, John Dewey High School was one of ten schools nationwide to receive the 10th Annual Businessweek Award for Instructional Innovation for incorporating technology into the classroom. The award and grant of $1,500 was presented at Businessweek's annual conference in San Francisco.

In 2000, John Dewey High School was named a New American High School for serving as a model for schools nationwide that have achieved high levels of success, and was showcased nationally at the White House.

In 2003, John Dewey High School was named as one of 209 successful schools that then-chancellor Joel L. Klein exempted from the citywide uniform curriculum.

In 2007, John Dewey High School was named one of America's Top 500 High Schools by U.S. News & World Report.

In 2008 and 2009, Newsweek named John Dewey High School one of America's Top 6% of high schools in its rankings, citing "how hard staffs work to challenge students with Advanced Placement college-level courses and tests."

In 2010, John Dewey High School's short film produced by the Film Class titled "A Block From Home" which was about an innocent victim who was caught in cross fire gun violence nearby Sheepshead Bay High School and takes on the progressive healing and the will to forge ahead. It was a part of Tribeca Film Festival in the Our City My Story event.

In 2013, U.S. News & World Report awarded John Dewey High School a silver medal for ranking as one of America's Top High Schools, and for ranking #127 in New York State.

In 2015, Niche named John Dewey High School as the fifth best high school in Brooklyn, the second best high school in the New York City Department of Education's District 21, top 100 most diverse schools in New York State, and was given an "Overall Niche Grade" of a B+, the only school in the district to achieve this grade.

In 2016, Niche gave John Dewey High School an "Overall Niche Grade" of an A−.

Notable appearances
 The school is shown during the chase scene of the Academy Award-winning movie The French Connection, which was largely filmed on a train that was parked at the Bay 50th Street station, located right outside the school, which at that time was served by the New York City Subway's B train.
 Actor Michael J. Fox was the guest speaker for the Class of 1984, he was also given an honorary high school diploma.
 Dr. Ruth Westheimer, sex therapist, professor, author, and talk show host, was the guest speaker at graduation for the Class of 1985.
 First Lady Hillary Clinton visited in April 2000 as part of the "Principals For a Day" program.
 Radio personality David Brody from Z100 and Elvis Duran and the Morning Show was the guest speaker at graduation on June 26, 2012. Brody graduated from John Dewey High School in 1983.

Notable alumni

 Imam Johari Abdul-Malik, imam at Dar-Ul Hijrah Islamic Center (attended Dewey as Winslow Seale)
 David Brody (comedy writer and radio producer) for Z100 NY Elvis Duran and the Morning Show
 Larry Charles, television/film writer, director, producer
 Gregory Crewdson, modern artist/photographer
 Eric Francis, investigative reporter and astrologer (attended Dewey as Eric Coppolino)
 Elliot Goldenthal (Class of 1971), composer
 Jerry Goldstein (Class of 1988), physicist
 Eric Gonzalez, Kings County District Attorney
 Pamela Harris (Class of 1977), former New York state assemblywoman
 Adam Kidan, businessman and lawyer
 Arthur Lander, biologist
 Spike Lee (Class of 1974), actor, director, producer, screenwriter
 Danny Leiner (Class of 1980), movie director
 Doris Ling-Cohan, New York State Supreme Court Justice
 Michael Mandel, chief economist, BusinessWeek Magazine
 Donald Margulies, Pulitzer Prize winning-playwright
 Angie Martinez, radio personality
 Prince Nana, sports entertainer, actor
 John Ortiz, actor
 Geoffrey Owens, actor
 Monica Owusu-Breen, television producer and screenwriter
 Jayson Paul, professional wrestler, known by his ring name JTG
 Stacey Prussman (Class of 1988) comedian, 2021 New York City mayoral candidate
 Frank Pugliese, playwright and television writer
 Colin Quinn, comedian and television personality
 Johnny Reinhard, composer, bassoonist, author, and conductor 
 Domenic M. Recchia, Jr. (Class of 1977), New York City Council member
 Stephen C. Robinson (Class of 1975), United States Attorney for the District of Connecticut (1998–2001) and United States District Judge in the Southern District of New York (2003–2010)
 Robert Sapolsky (Class of 1974), scientist
 Barry Sobel (Class of 1977), comedian and actor
 Brandon Steiner (Class of 1977), sports memorabilia marketer
 Ray Suarez (Class of 1974), journalist and author
 Michelle Ye, actress

References

External links
 
 John Dewey Alumni Association, Inc. a not-for-profit
 John Dewey High School Document Archives

1969 establishments in New York City
Educational institutions established in 1969
Dewey
Public high schools in Brooklyn
Dewey
Bensonhurst, Brooklyn
John Dewey